"There's No Limit" is a song co-written and recorded by American country music artist Deana Carter.  It was released in October 2002 as the lead-off single from her album I'm Just a Girl.  The song peaked at number 14 on the Hot Country Songs chart, her biggest hit on the chart since "How Do I Get There" topped the chart in 1997, and is her last single to make the Top 20.

Content
The song, written by Deana Carter with Randy Scruggs, is a moderate up-tempo backed by electric guitar with occasional harpsichord fills. Its lyrics are essentially of how Carter tells her male lover that she will do anything for him:

If it's a long, long road, baby, I'll walk it
If it's a mountain high, baby, I'll cross  it
If it's a deep blue sky, you know, I'll jump out in it
There's nothin' I would not do for you, there's no limit

Music video
A music video was released for the song, directed by Randee St. Nicholas. In the video, Carter and her boyfriend are seen talking on the phone. Carter sings and plays her guitar in her bedroom, and is later joined by her boyfriend. The video concludes with the two crawling under the sheets of her bed and kissing, while the chorus plays. 
 
The video for "There's No Limit" topped the CMT Top Twenty Countdown on April 17, 2003. It was also ranked at #29 on the 2008 version of CMT's 40 Sexiest Videos.

Chart performance
"There's No Limit" debuted at number 54 on the U.S. Billboard Hot Country Singles & Tracks chart for the week of October 26, 2002. After 24 weeks on the chart, it peaked at number 14 in April 2003.

Year-end charts

References

2002 singles
2002 songs
Arista Nashville singles
Deana Carter songs
Music videos directed by Randee St. Nicholas
Songs written by Deana Carter
Songs written by Randy Scruggs
Song recordings produced by Dann Huff